Ghirmai Ghebremariam was the ambassador of Eritrea to the United States and Canada from July 2006 to March 2011. In September 2006 he was sworn in and replaced Ambassador Girma Asmerom. Gebremariam was formerly the ambassador to the UK. His tenure as Eritrea's ambassador to the United States and Canada ended in March 2011.

References

Embassy of Eritrea in Washington, D.C.
Eritrean Ministry of Information: Ambassador Ghirmai presents credentials to US President September 13, 2006
The Washington Diplomat: His Excellency Ghirmai Ghebremariam

Living people
Ambassadors of Eritrea to Canada
Ambassadors of Eritrea to the United States
Ambassadors of Eritrea to the United Kingdom
Year of birth missing (living people)